Yong–Xun (Jyutping: Jung1 cam4, 邕潯方言), is a western branch of Yue Chinese spoken in some cities and towns in Guangxi province, including Nanning, Yongning, Guiping, Chongzuo, Ningming, Hengzhou, Baise, etc. This branch originates from Guangfu Yue and is therefore close to Standard Cantonese. It also absorbed some phonemes and words from the local languages Pinghua and Zhuang.

Dialects
Nanning dialect is representative. 
Nanning dialect
Yongning dialect
Guiping dialect
Chongzuo dialect
Ningmin dialect
Hengxian dialect
Baise dialect

References

Yue Chinese